The 365 Crete earthquake occurred at about sunrise on 21 July 365 in the Eastern Mediterranean, with an assumed epicentre near Crete. Geologists today estimate the undersea earthquake to have been a moment magnitude 8.5 or higher. It caused widespread destruction in the central and southern Diocese of Macedonia (modern Greece), Africa Proconsularis (northern Libya), Egypt, Cyprus, Sicily, and Hispania (Spain). On Crete, nearly all towns were destroyed.

The quake left a deep impression on the late antique mind, and numerous writers of the time referred to the event in their works.

Geological evidence 

Recent (2001) geological studies view the 365 Crete earthquake in connection with a clustering of major seismic activity in the Eastern Mediterranean between the fourth and sixth centuries which may have reflected a reactivation of all major plate boundaries in the region. An earthquake of such a size exceeds all modern ones known to have affected the region.

Carbon dating shows that corals on the coast of Crete were lifted  and clear of the water in one massive push. This indicates that the tsunami of 365 was generated by an earthquake in a steep fault in the Hellenic Trench near Crete. Scientists estimate that such a large uplift is only likely to occur once in 5,000 years; however, the other segments of the fault could slip on a similar scale—and this could happen every 800 years or so. It is uncertain whether "one of the contiguous patches might slip in the future."

Sedimentation increased dramatically in some areas of the Mediterranean Sea, while other areas had coastal sediments moved to deep waters.

Literary evidence 

Historians continue to debate whether ancient sources refer to a single catastrophic earthquake in 365, or whether they represent a historical amalgamation of a number of earthquakes occurring between 350 and 450. The interpretation of the surviving literary evidence is complicated by the tendency of late antique writers to describe natural disasters as divine responses or warnings to political and religious events. In particular, the virulent antagonism between rising Christianity and paganism at the time led contemporary writers to distort the evidence. Thus, the Sophist Libanius and the church historian Sozomenus appear to conflate the great earthquake of 365 with other lesser ones to present it as either divine sorrow or wrath—depending on their viewpoint—for the death of Emperor Julian, who had tried to restore the pagan religion two years earlier.

On the whole, however, the relatively numerous references to earthquakes in a time which is otherwise characterized by a paucity of historical records strengthens the case for a period of heightened seismic activity. Kourion on Cyprus, for example, is known to have been hit then by five strong earthquakes within a period of eighty years, leading to its permanent destruction.

Archeology
Archeological evidence for the particularly devastating effect of the 365 earthquake is provided by a survey of excavations which document the destruction of most late antique towns and cities in the Eastern and Southern Mediterranean around 365.

Tsunami 

The Roman historian Ammianus Marcellinus described in detail the tsunami that hit Alexandria and other places in the early hours of 21 July 365. His account is particularly noteworthy for clearly distinguishing the three main phases of a tsunami, namely an initial earthquake, the sudden retreat of the sea and an ensuing gigantic wave rolling inland:

The tsunami in 365 was so devastating that the anniversary of the disaster was still commemorated annually at the end of the sixth century in Alexandria as a "day of horror".

Gallery
Effects of the earthquake visible in the ancient remains:

See also 
426 BC Malian Gulf tsunami
List of earthquakes in Greece
List of historical earthquakes
List of tsunamis

Footnotes

References

Further reading 
Literary discussion on sources and providentialist tendencies
 G. J. Baudy, "Die Wiederkehr des Typhon. Katastrophen-Topoi in nachjulianischer Rhetorik und Annalistik: zu literarischen Reflexen des 21 Juli 365 n.C.", JAC 35 (1992), 47–82
 M. Henry, "Le temoignage de Libanius et les phenomenes sismiques de IVe siecle de notre ere. Essai d'interpretation', Phoenix 39 (1985), 36–61
 F. Jacques and B. Bousquet, “Le raz de maree du 21 juillet 365“, Mélanges de l'École française de Rome, Antiquité (MEFRA), Vol. 96, No.1 (1984), 423–61
 C. Lepelley, "Le presage du nouveau desastre de Cannes: la signification du raz de maree du 21 juillet 365 dans l'imaginaire d' Ammien Marcellin", Kokalos, 36–37 (1990–91) [1994], 359–74
 M. Mazza, "Cataclismi e calamità naturali: la documentazione letteraria", Kokalos 36–37 (1990–91) [1994], 307–30

Geological discussion
 Bibliography in: E. Guidoboni (with A. Comastri and G. Traina, trans. B. Phillips), Catalogue of Ancient Earthquakes in the Mediterranean Area up to the 10th Century (1994)
 D. Kelletat, "Geologische Belege katastrophaler Erdkrustenbewegungen 365 AD im Raum von Kreta", in E. Olhausen and H. Sonnabend (eds), Naturkatastrophen in der antiken Welt: Stuttgarter Kolloquium zur historischen Geographie des Altertums 6, 1996 (1998), 156–61
 P. Pirazzoli, J. Laborel, S. Stiros, "Earthquake clustering in the Eastern Mediterranean during historical times", Journal of Geophysical Research, Vol. 101 (1996), 6083–6097
 S. Price, T. Higham, L. Nixon, J. Moody, "Relative sea-level changes in Crete: reassessment of radiocarbon dates from Sphakia and West Crete", BSA 97 (2002), 171–200
 G. Waldherr, "Die Geburt der "kosmischen Katastrophe". Das seismische Großereignis am 21. Juli 365 n. Chr.", Orbis Terrarum 3 (1997), 169–201
 Stathis C. Stiros, "Was Alexandria (Egypt) Destroyed in A.D. 365? A Famous Historical Tsunami Revisited." Seismological Research Letters (2020); 91 (5): 2662–2673. doi: https://doi.org/10.1785/0220200045

External links 
Ancient Mediterranean Tsunami May Strike Again – National Geographic
The 365 A.D. Tsunami Destruction of Alexandria, Egypt: Erosion, Deformation of Strata and Introduction of Allochthonous Material  – Geological Society of America
 Ammianus Marcellinus Online Project
 Ancient city by the sea rises amid Egypt's resorts – Associated Press
 The tsunami of 365 – Livius.org
 Earthquake and tsunami of July 21, 365 AD in the eastern Mediterranean Sea – George Pararas-Carayannis

0365 Crete
0365 Crete
0365 Crete
4th-century natural disasters
Crete earthquake
Byzantine Crete
Greece in the Roman era
Nile Delta
4th-century earthquakes
360s in the Byzantine Empire
Ancient natural disasters
Tsunamis in Greece
Tsunamis in Egypt
Earthquakes in the Byzantine Empire